Parliament Gardens is a small park in downtown Windhoek, Namibia. It is located between the Tintenpalast (Namibia's Parliament building) and the Christuskirche. It was laid out in 1932 and was originally called the Tintenpalast gardens, adopting its present name after Namibian independence in 1990.

Parliament Gardens contains Namibia's first post-independence monument: a bronze-cast statue of the Herero chief Hosea Kutako. Two other Namibian nationalists are also honoured with bronze statues in the gardens: Hendrik Samuel Witbooi and Theophilus Hamutumbangela. The three statues flank the steps up to parliament's main entrance. 

The gardens used to be an olive plantation, and still include an olive grove. They also contain a bowling green lined with bougainvilleas along with a thatched-roof clubhouse. Twice a month the gardens host "Theatre in the Park", run by the College of the Arts.

In 2016, the opening of the Namibian Parliament was held in the Parliament Gardens because of limited space in the Tintenpalast. Due to a change to the Constitution in 2014, the number of parliamentarians had increased significantly, and so joint sittings have to be held elsewhere.

Rough Guides describes Parliament Gardens as "delightful, shady... definitely merit a stroll". The gardens are "particularly popular at lunchtimes and weekends, when students laze on the lawns poring over their books or each other." They are also a "popular place for a lunchtime picnic."

References

Parks in Namibia
Urban public parks
Buildings and structures in Windhoek
Geography of Windhoek
1932 establishments in South West Africa